Throwback uniforms, throwback jerseys, retro kits or heritage guernseys are sports uniforms styled to resemble the uniforms that a team wore in the past. One-time or limited-time retro uniforms are sometimes produced to be worn by teams in games, on special occasions such as anniversaries of significant events.

Throwback uniforms have proven popular in all major pro and college sports in North America, not only with fans, but with the teams' merchandising departments. Because the "authentic" uniforms (accurate reproductions) and less-authentic "replicas" had been so popular at retail, the professional leagues institutionalized throwbacks as "third jerseys".

Background 
Throwbacks were first popularized in Major League Baseball, where teams not only wore renditions of their past styles, but also tributes to defunct minor league and Negro league baseball teams as well. Often, the games where teams will wear throwbacks are promoted as "Turn Back The Clock Nights". Throwbacks also make frequent appearances every season in college football games, National Hockey League games, and in National Basketball Association games.

The first companies to produce throwback uniforms were Tiedman & Company Sportswear (college football, basketball, hockey, NFL and World Cup soccer), Mitchell & Ness (Major League Baseball), and Ebbets Field Flannels (Negro league baseball). All three companies are still in business; Tiedman & Company relaunched in 2009 under the brand name Tiedman & Formby Vintage Athletic Co.

In some instances, teams will wear "fauxbacks", which are new retro-style uniforms harkening back to a time that predates the team itself. For example, though the Tampa Bay Rays first took the field in 1998, they have worn 1979-style uniforms on several occasions since introducing them in 2012, and have also worn pre-1998 jerseys of several defunct local minor league teams, including the Tampa Tarpons and Tampa Smokers. In the NBA, the Dallas Mavericks have occasionally worn a 1970s-style basketball uniform as an alternate look since 2004 despite having been established in 1980.

"Fauxback" can also refer to a retro-inspired design which incorporates elements from the team's past into a new design. An example is the current uniform of the NFL's Buffalo Bills, which feature helmets resembling the team's white helmets from the 1970s but with a different, more modern stripe design.

American football

National Football League 
Throwbacks were introduced in the NFL in 1991 at retail through the NFL Throwbacks Collection. The rights to produce the vintage apparel was limited to six apparel licensees, including Tiedman & Company Sportswear (exclusive to jerseys), Riddell (helmets), Starter (caps), Nutmeg Mills (sweatshirts), and DeLong (jackets). In 1994, to honor the NFL's 75th Anniversary, teams were allowed to wear modern versions of their old uniform styles.

However, the designs varied widely in their accuracy:
 While no attempt was made to simulate obsolete leather helmets which were phased out in the 1950s, teams simulating uniforms from the era of leather headgear simply removed all decals and striping from their regular hard-shell helmets.
 A rule imposed by the AFL–NFL merger in 1970 adopted the AFL's policy of all jerseys displaying the player's last name on the back side. This practice was not part of the NFL officially until after the merger, but to keep consistency with current rules, the names were placed on the back side of all throwback jerseys.
 In most instances the fonts and typestyles used were only approximate matches at best.
 The Arizona Cardinals, Chicago Bears and Pittsburgh Steelers wore reproductions of uniforms that pre-dated large numerals on the front of jerseys, so instead smaller numerals were worn on the right shoulder.
 The Dallas Cowboys and Buffalo Bills received some criticism for their portrayal of their throwbacks. The Cowboys wore their early 1960s uniforms with their current helmet, while the Bills wore their then-current uniforms with the old "standing buffalo" logo in white on their red helmets, in place of the current blue "charging buffalo" logo. Later that season, the Cowboys used the "double-star" uniform, which could be considered an updated version of the 1960s jerseys. Ironically, both teams have since adopted these throwbacks more accurately as alternates, with Dallas now using the original, plain star helmet and Buffalo using the original red "standing buffalo" helmet on white background, as well as wearing the AFL-era jerseys as opposed to the Jim Kelly/Marv Levy-era jerseys (the two jerseys have few noticeable differences other than sleeve stripes, which were present on the 1960s jerseys but not on the 1990s ones). The Bills adopted 1975-era throwbacks, with white helmets, as their main uniform in 2011. The New York Jets also received similar criticism for using their throwback logo on their then-current green helmets; when they adopted the throwback design full-time in 1998, they also went back to their original-style white helmets. The Bills and Cowboys did the same when they adopted their retro unis.
 The Miami Dolphins, New Orleans Saints, Seattle Seahawks, Tampa Bay Buccaneers, Indianapolis Colts and Cleveland Browns had not had major uniform redesigns up to that point or only made subtle changes, as the Seahawks and Buccaneers had joined the league just 18 years earlier. The Seahawks and Buccaneers have also since redesigned their uniforms in 2002, 2012 and 1997, 2014 respectively, while the Dolphins made some minor updates in 1997, then a brand new look altogether in 2013, the Saints got new uniforms in 2000, and also the Browns in 2015.

All the teams were informed that they would be wearing the Throwbacks during Week Three of the season. Some teams continued to wear theirs throughout the season. The San Francisco 49ers wore replicas of their 1955 uniforms in their Super Bowl XXIX victory. The uniforms were well-liked enough that the 49ers brought them back, in slightly modified form, for 1996–1997. In 1998, the gold pants from before were returned, in more modern form. In 2009, the team debuted an updated design of the 1980s uniforms that won them four of their five Super Bowls.

Both of the NFL's New York City teams' throwbacks proved so popular with their fans that the teams returned to wearing them full-time soon afterwards: The Jets' replicas of their 1968 uniforms (with a darker shade of green than before), and the Giants' 1961 uniforms, with the lowercase "ny" instead of the underlined uppercase "GIANTS" – which was retained as a secondary logo – imposed after moving to East Rutherford, New Jersey. Both teams have modernized the 1960s decals for their current primary corporate logos.

As a result of the NFL modifying its rules to allow teams to wear alternate jerseys in 2002, throwbacks still make occasional appearances. The Thanksgiving Day games hosted by the Detroit Lions and Dallas Cowboys have been a showcase of throwbacks in recent years. The Bills, San Diego Chargers and Cowboys traditionally wear their early 1960s throwbacks twice each season.  Additionally, the Lions dropped their much-criticized black alternates in favor of the popular 1940s and 1950s throwbacks (plain blue jersey, silver pants and helmets) in 2008. However, due to the NFL's regulations about player safety and helmets both teams have ceased wearing the throwback uniforms. The Lions in 2011 and Cowboys in 2013.

The Cleveland Browns throwbacks are based on a uniform/helmet combination that first appeared in 1957 when Jim Brown was drafted. (Player numbers appeared on the side of the helmet that year.) The Browns began wearing their throwbacks in 2006 as part of the team's 60th Anniversary. They only wear them once per season.

The Tampa Bay Buccaneers, who substantially changed their uniforms and team colors in 1997, never wore their orange throwbacks from 1997 to 2008. In 2009, the team wore their throwbacks for the first time against the Packers on November 8 to debut the "Buccaneers' Ring of Honor." The club continued to do so annually until 2014.

The San Diego Chargers wore their 1960s style powder-blue uniforms with white helmets as alternates from 2002 to 2006 and in 2007 adopted a modified version as their full-time uniforms. Meanwhile, the San Francisco 49ers wore their 1980s-style home red uniforms as throwbacks in 2002 (in 2005 the team re-designated them as alternate uniforms to be worn 1–2 home games a season). The team also petitioned the league to wear the throwbacks on the 2007 season opening night, as a tribute to their late former head coach Bill Walsh. For the 2009 season, an updated design based heavily on the 1980s throwbacks was debuted by the 49ers, which was combined with the team's current modern logo. On September 16, 2007, the Pittsburgh Steelers, celebrating their 75th season, wore a variation of their older early '60s uniforms that featured gold helmets with black stripe, black jerseys with gold numbers and stripes, and white pants with black-and-gold side stripes as they hosted Buffalo. They wore them again on Monday Night Football on November 5 against Baltimore. The Steelers enjoyed immense success in both games, winning each handily (26–3 vs. Buffalo, 38–7 vs. Baltimore), in direct contrast to the team's struggles when they wore those jerseys originally. On November 11, 2007, The New York Giants, wore their red uniforms against the division rival Dallas Cowboys. Also in 2007, the New York Jets twice wore replicas of their New York Titans uniforms – once against the Philadelphia Eagles, and once against the Miami Dolphins.  Since then, the Jets have worn the Titans uniforms several more times – twice in 2008, three times in 2009, and once in 2011.  For two of the 2009 games, the Jets wore white versions, replicating the Titans road uniforms.

The Eagles wore their powder blue and yellow throwback jerseys during the home game against the Lions on September 23, 2007. Though the Eagles had a big 56–21 victory, these particular Throwbacks were criticised as being very unattractive. During Sunday Night Football on NBC that week, Keith Olbermann named the Philadelphia Eagles the "Worst Persons in the NFL" for their blue-and-yellow throwback jerseys, citing "Throwbacks? Try throw-ups!" The blue and yellow uniforms, which are the same colors as the flag of the City of Philadelphia, were used by the Eagles, and their predecessors, the defunct Frankford Yellowjackets franchise, until the 1940s when the more familiar pre-Jeffrey Lurie era kelly green was introduced. The kelly green throwbacks from the 1960 season were wore for the 2010 season opener vs. the Green Bay Packers to commemorate the 50th anniversary of when the Eagles beat the Packers to win the 1960 NFL Championship.

For the 2009 season, commemorating the 50th anniversary of the founding of the American Football League, the eight charter members of the AFL wore throwback uniforms from the early 1960s on select "Legacy Weekends." The Dallas Cowboys, also celebrating their 50th anniversary season, wore throwback jerseys for some games.

The Packers, starting in 2010, introduced their 1929 throwback uniforms as their alternative uniform. Honoring the Packers first ever championship team in 1929, the uniform features a navy blue jersey with yellow numbers, with an added twist, as the uniforms in 1929 featured a small yellow circle in the front with a blue number in it. The circle and numbers were enlarged to meet current NFL uniform rules. Complementing the rest of the uniform were tan pants, replicating the canvas uniform pants used during the 1920s. The team switched to their 1940s uniforms for the 2015 season, which removed the yellow circle but retained the color scheme.

In their 80th anniversary, the Pittsburgh Steelers released a throwback uniform that honored the 1934 team. The uniform was a gold and black horizontal-striped jersey white squares containing the numbers. The throwback uniform was worn twice during the regular season. and drew major media attention. USA Today said that the Steelers looked like "bumblebee[s] in a Depression-era chain gang."

The NFL imposed a new rule for the 2013 season prohibiting the use of alternate colored helmets, eliminating many of the historically accurate throwback uniforms that had been in use up to that point. Teams are still allowed to use alternate decals (or no decals at all) for their throwbacks, but they must use them on the regular helmets. The one-helmet rule was repealed in 2022.

College football 
The Clemson University football team wore throwback uniforms in a single game during the 1995 season (October 7 vs. Georgia), in commemoration of the 100th anniversary of Clemson's football program. The uniforms resembled those of the 1939 Tigers, Clemson's first bowl team. In a continuation of the centennial celebration, the uniforms were also worn for one game the following season, a September 7, 1996, contest against Furman.

The Texas Longhorns college football team wore throwback uniforms for a single game during their 2005 national championship season as a way of honoring the past. The throwback jerseys were similar to jerseys worn during their 1963 National Championship season under Coach Darrell K Royal.

The University of Illinois football team wore throwback uniforms in a single game on September 6, 2008, in honor of the re-dedication of the renovated Memorial Stadium. The uniforms were styled after the 1960s-era uniforms worn by linebacker Dick Butkus.

The University of Virginia football team wore throwback uniforms in a single game on September 6, 2008, in honor of Virginia's teams from 1984 through 1993. The university's athletic department termed the game a "Retro Game" instead of using the term "throwback." The University of Virginia football team also wore throwback uniforms in a single game on September 29, 2012, in honor of Virginia's 1968 team and Frank Quayle.

The University of Florida football team wore throwback uniforms in a single game on September 30, 2006, in honor of Florida's teams in the 1960s.

The University of Washington football team wore throwback uniforms on September 29, 2007, to honor the 1960 national championship team. The throwback jerseys were dark blue with gold helmets. On October 16, 2021 the Huskies again wore throwback jerseys to honor the 30th anniversary of the 1991 national championship team.

For the 2009 and 2010 seasons, as part of Nike's Pro Combat program, several college football teams, including Ohio State and Oregon State wore throwback-inspired uniforms.  In addition, for the 2009 playing of the "Holy War" rivalry against the University of Utah Utes (and also in the Las Vegas Bowl), the BYU Cougars donned royal blue throwback uniforms to commemorate the 25th anniversary of their 1984 National Championship season.  These throwbacks, along with another alternate royal blue uniform, have been employed occasionally in subsequent seasons; since in 2014, they have been worn for the team's homecoming game each year.

The Kansas Jayhawks football team wore throwback uniforms on October 1, 2011, to honor the 50th anniversary of the 1961 KU football team, winners of the 1961 Bluebonnet Bowl, the program's first-ever bowl victory.

The University of Oregon football team wore throwback uniforms on October 8, 2016 to honor the 100th anniversary of the 1916 team, then known as the Webfoots. The jerseys were navy blue with yellow "Webfoots" lettering across the chest.

Association football 

'Retro shirts', as they are known in the United Kingdom, are also sometimes used in association football, albeit with modern fabrics. In 2005–06 Arsenal changed their home colours from their traditional red and white to a variant of maroon known as redcurrant as a commemoration of their final season at Highbury Stadium; this colour was supposedly the same shade the team had worn when they first played at Highbury in 1913, although later evidence suggested that Arsenal's main colour at that time was a more standard shade known as 'Garibaldi red'. Redcurrant, however, still played a part in their kits since; most recently on their yellow change kit featuring redcurrant shorts and pinstripes on the shirt and socks, between 2010 and 2012.

Manchester United wore several retro-style kits in the 1990s and 2000s, based on kits the worn by the club in the 1950s and '60s, as well as that worn by their first ever team, known then as Newton Heath.  The Newton Heath-inspired kit was introduced in 1992 and worn for two seasons as a third kit. They wore a replica of their jersey from 1958 during the Manchester derby against Manchester City on February 10, 2008, at Old Trafford to mark the 50th anniversary of the Munich air disaster four days earlier. United were granted special dispensation by the Premier League to wear the one-off uniform which was devoid of logos and kit markings, and used the traditional "one to eleven" numbering scheme rather than using squad numbers. In a gesture of solidarity, Manchester City similarly removed the sponsor and manufacturer logos from their kits for the game, giving their shirts the same clean and empty look resembling the plain shirts of the 1950s when logos and team badges were not worn. However, they used the current season's kit style and chose not to go the whole distance in producing a retro-looking kit; retaining the club crest, competition sleeve patches, and the player name and squad number on the kit but added a black ribbon above the right breast. The previous season, 2006–07, United introduced a similar 1950s-style uniform to celebrate 50 years of the Busby Babes' first league championship. After their Champions League victory in 2008, United introduced another retro-style kit for 2008–09, celebrating the 40th anniversary of their first European Cup win.  The club unveiled an all-blue third kit, based on the one worn against Benfica in the 1968 final.

In 1999, to celebrate the 100th anniversary of its foundation, A.C. Milan introduced a retro kit that was worn on several official matches by its players across the 1999-2000 season. The kit resembled the thin stripes design of the first silk shirts used by the club in the first decade of the 20th century.

More authentic reproductions of kits from the past have become popular fashion items, especially jerseys linked to successful or memorable teams. When France won the 1998 World Cup, their uniform was reminiscent of the design of the triumphant Euro 1984 team, with a red horizontal stripe and three thin horizontal stripes across the chest. Germany clearly based their 2018 World Cup design, featuring an unusual angular stripe pattern across the chest, on the shirt they wore while winning the trophy in 1990, although they failed to attain the same level of performance. Several other nations at that tournament had designs based on 'classics' of 20–30 years earlier.

When the United States men's soccer team took the field between 1999 and 2001, their plain white uniform with a thick V-neck collar looked reminiscent of the U.S. Soccer Federation's first uniform worn in 1916. A similar uniform was produced in 2013, complete with vintage crest, to mark the 100th anniversary of the USSF.

For the FIFA Centenary Match in 2004, France and Brazil played in kits resembling their first ever home kits.  The Brazilian team wore white tops with blue trim, the original colours of their home kit, which was replaced in 1951 by today's yellow top with green trim after the 1950 World Cup defeat.

Tottenham Hotspur celebrated their 125th anniversary during the 2007–08 season by launching a special kit in the club's early colours, sky blue and white, which were originally worn in 1885. The kit was worn for one game only, a 4–4 home draw to Aston Villa.

For the 2009–10 Premier League, newly promoted Burnley wore a redesigned version of their 1959–60 Football League kits, when they last won the then-First Division.

Southampton celebrated the club's 125th anniversary in 2010–11, by wearing the strip worn by the team's original forebears, which consisted of a white shirt with a red sash, white shorts and black socks.

During the later stages of the 2011–12 season, financially troubled Scottish club Rangers wore their normal blue shirts on the pitch, but began selling and encouraging fans to wear throwback red and black striped scarves, the traditional colours of the burgh of Govan (where Ibrox Stadium is located) in an attempt to raise money. The club would be placed in administration, face liquidation and then sold to a new ownership group, and forced to re-apply for entry to the fourth (lowest) tier of the senior Scottish football system for the 2012–13 season. That year, Rangers and rivals Celtic both released retro-style simple kits with round collars and small sponsor logos to acknowledge historic anniversaries, despite being with different suppliers; however, Rangers' absence from the top division meant they never met wearing the 'matching' designs.

English club West Bromwich Albion wore a replica of their 1968 FA Cup Final kit, in their Premier League game against Leicester City on April 11, 2015. It was worn to honour the match-winning goalscorer in the 1968 Cup Final, Jeff Astle, who died in 2002 due to chronic traumatic encephalopathy as a result of heading the heavy leather footballs through his career. The kit used the 1–11 numbering system save for the goalkeeper's shirt, which was left blank as they were in those days.

2014–15 Scottish Championship winners Heart of Midlothian F.C. released a replica of the shirt worn by the team 100 years earlier in the 1914–15 season: plain maroon shirt with a white collar and fly-button opening, with no sponsorship logos. Though the 1914–15 shirt bore no badge, the retro shirt had an embroidered badge in the style of the club's logo of that time. The shirt and badge also commemorate those connected with the club who volunteered for the Great War en-masse in November 1914, joining a newly forming wartime volunteer infantry battalion, 16th Battalion Royal Scots, commanded by George McCrae (politician) MP. Spurred on by Hearts, "McCrae's Battalion" also attracted players and supporters from other Scottish teams plus various sportsmen. The first football team to join up, Hearts and "McCrae's Battalion" were mentioned in thanks by Winston Churchill in Parliament and proved a catalyst in the formation of other football and sportsmen battalions of Kitchener's Army. Heart of Midlothian lost 7 players killed in the war, plus others maimed or gassed and unable to resume their careers after the war.

In 2018–2020 Northern Ireland Had a Kit that resembled the one from 1978 to 1982

For the 2019 Copa América, the Brazil national team released a 100th anniversary shirt, in white with blue details. It resembled the shirt worn in the first official match v Exeter City in 1919. The white uniform would be last worn in the 1950 FIFA World Cup 'final' that Brazil lost to Uruguay at Estadio Maracaná. The retro kit debuted in the first match v Bolivia.

Australian rules football 

Throwback uniforms, more commonly called heritage guernseys, are worn occasionally by clubs in the Australian Football League, mostly to commemorate the anniversaries of past successes or events. Between 2003 and 2007, there was an annual "Heritage Round", in which all clubs were encouraged to wear heritage guernseys from either their club or state.

The heritage guernsey of the Port Adelaide Football Club has been a regular source of controversy. The primary historical guernsey of the Port Adelaide Football Club, when it dominated national football the years before World War I and the South Australian National Football League for the 19th century, was black with a white "prison bars" design; however, when the club entered the Australia Football League in 1997, it was forced to change its colours to avoid a clash with the Collingwood Football Club, who also wear black and white although in a different design. Whether or not Port Adelaide is permitted to wear its black and white guernsey in any heritage matches, even those not played against Collingwood, has been a point of contention between the clubs.

The most recent instance of the club wearing the guernsey was during the 2020 Showdown.

Baseball

Major League Baseball 

In 1990, the Chicago White Sox wore replicas of their 1917 World Series uniforms against the Milwaukee Brewers as part of the White Sox celebration of the final season at Comiskey Park. During the game, the scoreboard and public address system were turned off, and the lineups announced with a hand-held megaphone. Since then, these games have proven popular not only among team fans but also with viewers of TV highlight shows. ESPN, for the highlights of the 1990 game, sped up the highlights and showed them in black and white to emulate the silent film of the era. The team then adopted a modified version of the 1959 "Go-Go Sox" era jerseys for the first year at the new Comiskey Park in 1991, having kept that design since and winning the 2005 World Series in that design, ending an 88-year World Series championship drought.

With the introduction of interleague play, when the Atlanta Braves played the Boston Red Sox for the first time in a regular season game in Boston in 1997, the teams wore uniforms that traced back to the initial season in which each team adopted the current nickname, the Braves wearing road uniforms from the 1912 season with the word 'BOSTON' and the Red Sox wearing 1908 uniforms with a large red sock with the word 'BOSTON' in white on the sock. It was the Braves' first official game against the Red Sox since the team moved to Milwaukee after the 1952 season. Braves manager Bobby Cox went on record as being firmly against his team being identified as 'Boston' by their uniforms.

Some throwback nights featured the Oakland Athletics wearing one combo or another of the gold/white/green uniform set it featured in the 1970s and 1980s, or the Pittsburgh Pirates' black-and-gold combo from the same era – on June 26, 2010, they did so against one another, with Pittsburgh in black and Oakland in gold.

In 2003 the St. Louis Cardinals hosted the Baltimore Orioles with teams wearing retro St. Louis Cardinals and St. Louis Browns (the predecessor to today's Orioles, which moved to Baltimore for 1954) uniforms, respectively. The scoreboard that day said "Browns" and the stadium announcer played along with the fantasy as well.

Also in 2003, in commemoration of the 100th anniversary of the first modern World Series, the two participants in that game (the Boston Red Sox and the Pittsburgh Pirates) met in a 3-game interleague series at PNC Park in Pittsburgh. While the Red Sox took two of three of those games with both teams wearing their standard uniforms, the one the Pirates won was meant to replicate their matchup in the 1903 World Series with both teams wearing 1903-era throwbacks. Although baseball teams did not have uniform numbers at the time, to keep with the current rules numbers were put on the backs of the otherwise-accurate throwbacks. The JumboTron screen was left with a static background, and the scoreboard had the different team names at the time: the "Boston Americans" and the "Pittsburg Pirates". The stadium crew at PNC Park also did other 1903-era activities such as using a megaphone for announcements.

In 2006 the New York Mets, in honor of the 20th anniversary of the 1986 World Series, held a "turn-back-the-clock-night" and wore their 1986 uniforms.  In 2009 the Mets played three games of a four-game set against the San Francisco Giants in a "fauxback" jersey based on early 20th century New York Giants' jerseys with a giant "NY" on the chest, but using the Mets' current team colors of orange and blue. (The Mets are the only team to have worn a throwback from their home city's past instead of their franchise's past; while the Minnesota Twins and Texas Rangers, both of whom were once the Washington Senators, have each used throwbacks from their previous hometown, the city's current team, the Washington Nationals, have worn both Twins-Senators and Rangers-Senators throwbacks as well.) In 2008, the Philadelphia Phillies adopted an alternate uniform based on their 1948 uniforms, but with modern graphics on an off-white color background.

Not all throwbacks use Major League uniforms; at least 15 MLB teams have at some point paid tribute to the pre-integration Negro leagues by wearing the uniform of a Negro league team from the city's past; in almost every case both teams do so simultaneously. Since the Homestead Grays played "home" games in both Washington and Pittsburgh, the team has been honored as such by both the Nationals and Pirates; in 2008 the two teams did so together, with Washington wearing the Grays' home uniforms and Pittsburgh the away ones.

The Tampa Bay Rays have staged a "Turn Back the Clock" promotion with a retro theme and throwback uniforms almost every season of their existence. Because the franchise does not yet have a long history from which to choose uniforms, they have often worn the uniforms of historical local teams such as the Tampa Tarpons of the Florida State League (worn in 1999, 2006, and 2010), the St. Petersburg Pelicans of the Senior Professional Baseball Association (worn in 2008), the St. Petersburg Saints (2007) and Tampa Smokers (2011) of the Florida International League, and the University of Tampa Spartans (2000). The Rays have worn their own uniforms for Turn Back the Clock night only once: in 2009, when they wore Devil Rays "rainbow" uniforms from their 1998 inaugural season. Usually, the Rays' opponent on Turn Back the Clock night wear throwbacks of their own from the same era as the Rays' retro uniforms. For example, the Houston Astros wore their 1980s "Rainbow Guts" uniforms, the Dodgers wore the 1955 road uniforms of the Brooklyn Dodgers, the Mets wore the road unis of their 1969 championship team, and the Orioles wore their rare all-orange uniforms from the early 1970s.

The San Diego Padres have also worn multiple throwback uniforms. Pre-1969 designs have represented the Padres of the Pacific Coast League. During the 2010 season, throwback uniforms were worn during all Thursday home day games. Multiple designs and color schemes were used, including the 1969 "first major league season" brown and gold, 1984 "first World Series" white with gold lettering and brown trim (and "RAK" on the sleeves for then-recently deceased owner Ray A. Kroc), and a 1990s era white with orange-trimmed blue lettering (while these were the accurate Padres jersey of the period, the design is also very similar to that of the New York Mets, as the owners of the team at the time were investors from New York). All of these were fairly accurate representations of the team's uniforms and colors of the period, and in most games the visiting team wore throwback uniforms of a similar period. For example, at the final home game on September 30, the visiting Chicago Cubs and the Padres both wore 1984-era jerseys, in tribute to the 1984 NLCS, in which the same two teams played against each other.

In recent years, the Milwaukee Brewers resurrected their old 1980s pinstriped uniforms with the old ball-in-glove "MB" logo on the caps for use as an alternate uniform; they would eventually return to using the latter in the 2020 season full-time, with both the logo and uniform now reminiscent of the 80s uniforms.

In 2008, the Toronto Blue Jays unveiled their new "Flashback Friday" powder blue throwback uniforms, similar to those worn between the 1977 and 1979 seasons.

The Cleveland Guardians throwbacks are usually worn once a year in July and normally are based on their uniforms from the mid-1970s to the early 1980s (most notably, their 1974 "All Red" home uniforms). They have also worn uniforms based on the 1948 Indians in honor of Larry Doby, the first African-American player in the American League with the Indians. Both only use the current name or city and appropriate typeface, with a "block C" replacing the depreciated and controversial Chief Wahoo logo, due to the team's name change in 2022.

The 2011 Arizona Diamondbacks celebrated the tenth anniversary of their 2001 World Series championship on September 9–11. To commemorate the event the Diamondbacks held a reunion of players who had been on the championship team. They also wore the purple, teal, and copper uniforms that the team wore from 1998 to 2006.

To celebrate the 100th anniversary of Fenway Park, the New York Yankees and Boston Red Sox wore 1912 throwbacks during a regular-season game on April 20, 2012; the Yankees' 1912 uniforms were a nod to their days as the New York Highlanders.

In the 1999 season, MLB held a series of "Turn Ahead the Clock" nights. It was inspired by an independently held promotion on July 18, 1998, at a game between the Seattle Mariners and the Kansas City Royals. During those nights, teams wore uniforms envisioned as they might be in the year 2021. Twenty-two teams ultimately participated over 13 different games in 1999, with some teams wearing the uniforms more than once.

In 2016, to celebrate the 30th anniversary of their 1986 world championship season, the New York Mets revived their 1986 uniforms to be used for all Sunday home games.

Other leagues 
In 1921 a baseball game held at Rickwood Field as part of the Semicentennial of Birmingham, Alabama was played in "old-style" uniforms and according to "the rules of the games as they were in 1872.". Since 1996 Rickwood Field has been the site of the annual "Rickwood Classic", a regular season Birmingham Barons game in which both Southern League teams wear uniforms honoring some period of their respective histories.

The Lotte Giants of the Korea Baseball Organization has "Again 1984/1992" day once per month in commemoration of their league titles from those respective years. The team dresses in their old baby blue jerseys as well as their old cap, complete with the old logo. The "Again 1984/1992" games are usually the most popular games of the year in Busan, with the stadium as well as the throwback merchandising usually selling out fast. Due to this success, starting in 2008, other teams in the league such as Doosan Bears and Samsung Lions have started to incorporate a similar style of throwback day as well.

The Buffalo Bisons of the International League adopted a throwback uniform as their main jersey in 2012 as part of their change in parent club affiliation to the Toronto Blue Jays.

Basketball

National Basketball Association 
In the 1996–97 NBA season, the NBA celebrated its 50th anniversary by introducing throwback jerseys, known as "Hardwood Classics". The Toronto Raptors were notable for wearing the uniforms of the long-defunct Toronto Huskies, an original BAA team. The Raptors have since brought back this tradition on certain occasions, notably games against the New York Knicks. The Chicago Bulls wore script-logo throwbacks from the beginning of Michael Jordan's career. Some of the throwbacks that were introduced in this season have been brought back on more occasions since, notably the Golden State Warriors, whose throwback placed the players' numbers inside an angled cable car (a reference to San Francisco, where they had played in the early years in California).

In more recent years, throwback jerseys in the NBA have recalled some of the more gaudy uniforms of the NBA and the ABA, ranging from the aforementioned Warriors uniforms, to the Detroit Pistons' lightning bolt uniforms of the Dick Vitale era of the late 1970s, to the Miami Floridians throwbacks worn by the Heat, and the Cleveland Cavaliers' 1980s era jerseys worn by Brad Daugherty, Mark Price, and Ron Harper as well as uniforms based on the early and mid-1970s. In contrast, the New York Knicks often wear throwback uniforms from the 1970s and 1980s that are understated by comparison. The warmups and uniform shorts of that era feature an "interlocking NY" identical to the one worn by the New York Yankees on their caps and home jerseys. Most "Hardwood Classics" jerseys worn by current players for games, however, are based on modern fabrics, and not the classic fabric designs of the past. The Los Angeles Lakers wore throwback short-shorts in 2007 for one game. Kobe Bryant complained, saying, "I feel violated. I feel naked. It's one thing to see those old guys wearing them on film, it's another to actually wear them". The Philadelphia 76ers began wearing throwback jerseys from their championship season of 1982–83 in 2007–08 to honor the 25th anniversary of their championship. They were so popular that the Sixers kept these jerseys for next year, and reverted to their old logo (modified with a newer "6") for the 2009–10 season.

The Orlando Magic are notable for wearing the same throwback design at least twice; their black pinstriped throwback was used in 2003–04, 2006–07 and 2009–10 seasons. They also wore the blue pinstriped throwbacks in 2004–05 and the white pinstriped throwbacks in 2005–06. The then-New Orleans Hornets, Charlotte Bobcats, Los Angeles Clippers, Minnesota Timberwolves and Memphis Grizzlies were also notable for wearing throwbacks of long-forgotten American Basketball Association franchises New Orleans Buccaneers, Carolina Cougars, Los Angeles Stars, Minnesota Muskies and Memphis Tams/Pros. The San Antonio Spurs also paid tribute to their predecessors Dallas Chaparrals, while the Bulls and the Washington Wizards did the same to a pair of former Chicago-based NBA franchises, the Stags and Zephyrs.

The usage of throwback uniforms even inspired some NBA teams to acquire elements used from old uniform designs in creating new ones. For example, the Detroit Pistons, Milwaukee Bucks, Cleveland Cavaliers and Golden State Warriors reverted to their original color schemes while adding some accent colors to create a more modern look, while the Magic and the Charlotte Bobcats revived the use of pinstripes on their uniforms. The Dallas Mavericks briefly used a third jersey with the green, blue and white color scheme of the 1980s. The Houston Rockets revived the classic red and gold scheme in unveiling their new alternate uniform in 2009. The Utah Jazz are re-using their classic "J" note logo and a similar (though not the same) color scheme, and also plan to adopt a similar uniform design to what they originally wore from 1974 to 1996. The Washington Wizards also went retro, with secondary logos inspired from the old Bullets logos and the modernized "Stars and Stripes" uniform worn from 1974 through 1987. The New York Knicks eliminated black from their color scheme and unveiled a modern adaptation of their 1970–75 uniforms, sans the shorts' side stripes, addition of silver trim, and a bolder, less arched "NEW YORK" script. The Sacramento Kings have used their classic Kansas City-era script to their gold and then black alternate uniforms. The Denver Nuggets revived the 'rainbow' uniforms from the 1980s as an alternate uniform, this time with the current colors and typeface, while the Oklahoma City Thunder wore alternate uniforms with a vertically arranged front script similar to those worn by the Oscar Robertson-era Cincinnati Royals. The Phoenix Suns paid tribute to the 1990s by unveiling new uniforms featuring a modified streaking sun.

As of 2019, NBA throwback uniforms are classified as part of Nike's Classic series. The uniforms were replicas of past jersey designs and feature truncated arm stripes, the Nike logo on the right chest and space for an advertiser logo on the left chest.

Other leagues 

In 2003, the Kansas State Wildcats men's basketball team wore throwback jerseys in home games against Kansas and Missouri to celebrate the program's 100th anniversary season. The jerseys were lavender with black letters and numerals, similar to the uniforms worn by Jack Hartman's teams in the 1970s and 1980s, during some of KSU's best seasons.

The Kansas Jayhawks basketball team wore throwbacks in March 2005 to commemorate the 50th anniversary of Allen Fieldhouse. In February 2008 and February 2013, they wore throwbacks for the 20th and 25th anniversaries, respectively, of the 1988 NCAA championship team, and did so again in February 2012 to honor the 1952 NCAA championship team's 60th anniversary.

Box lacrosse 
The Philadelphia Wings indoor lacrosse team ditched their silver, red, and black uniforms for a game to wear their original orange and white jerseys worn in the early 1970s from the original National Lacrosse League. For the 100th anniversary of the rivalry between Johns Hopkins and Maryland in men's lacrosse, both teams wore special retro jerseys. During the 35th anniversary of women's field hockey at Dartmouth College, the Big Green are wearing a special harlequin-design throwback uniform.

Canadian football 
The first documented use of a throwback uniform came during the 1998 season, when the Calgary Stampeders wore 1948 red striped jerseys to celebrate the first Grey Cup championship won by the Stampeders franchise. The jerseys were worn on October 4, 1998, against the BC Lions. The BC Lions were the next to wear throwback jerseys in 2003, as they were celebrating their 50th season with orange replica jerseys from the 1954 BC Lions season. Those jerseys were worn four times that season with the first being the home opener that year. In both cases, neither uniform was accurate as the jerseys were paired with pants and helmets from both teams' present day sets. In 2007, the Saskatchewan Roughriders wore green replica jerseys from the late 1960s to 1970s with double white striping over the shoulders. As opposed to the single season usage the Stampeders and Lions employed, the Roughriders wore these jerseys from 2007 to 2013, including their usage in the 97th and 98th Grey Cup.

It wasn't until the 2008 CFL season that the league started to truly embrace throwback uniforms when they announced that the Winnipeg Blue Bombers and Toronto Argonauts would play two games (September 12 in Toronto and October 10 in Winnipeg) to celebrate and recognize the 1950s and in particular, the 1950 Mud Bowl Grey Cup game. Both teams wore coloured jerseys, as was common during the 1950s. Toronto's jerseys were a light blue in colour, with dark blue striping on the sleeves and the team's old "Pull Together" football-as-a-ship logo on the shoulders. The Blue Bombers' jerseys were dark blue in colour, with gold sleeve stripes. The team's 1950s-era logo was on the front of the jersey, just below the V in the neck. A special CFL "Retro Week" logo adorned each jersey as well, that logo being a take-off of the maple leaf one used as the league symbol from 1954 through 1969.

For the 2009 CFL season, all eight teams wore retro uniforms, this time based on uniforms from the 1960s. Week 3 of the 2009 season featured all teams wearing their retro uniforms. When revealed at the time, four teams had white retro jerseys and four had coloured retro jerseys. As the season progressed, Saskatchewan added a green 1960s jersey for the Labour Day Classic and Calgary wore a white 1960s jersey for the Labour Day rematch versus Edmonton. 11 games were scheduled during the season to feature both teams wearing these uniforms while more were added later on.

In 2010, all eight teams again wore retro uniforms and for this season it was based on uniforms worn from the 1970s. Teams wore retro uniforms during weeks 6 and 7, however, contrary to the previous year, only the Saskatchewan Roughriders wore white throwback uniforms, meaning most teams wore their regular white uniforms as the away team. The Roughriders wore their regular 1970s throwback jersey during retro games they hosted. Additionally, during this season, the Roughriders were celebrating their 100th anniversary as a franchise and wore black, red, and silver throwback uniforms similar to the ones worn by the Regina Roughriders from 1912 to 1947. These uniforms were worn on July 17, 2010.

While the league had originally planned to celebrate with retro uniforms each season leading up to the 100th Grey Cup, the CFL did not introduce 1980s-themed uniforms for the 2011 CFL season. Some teams (Calgary, Saskatchewan, Toronto, and Winnipeg) continued wearing the previous year's retro uniforms while the rest wore no throwback uniforms at all. In 2012, all teams remodeled their full uniform set with only Saskatchewan and Winnipeg carrying over their 1970s throwback uniforms.

In 2013, the Toronto Argonauts wore 1980s throwback uniforms on August 23, 2013, to celebrate the 30th anniversary of the 71st Grey Cup championship. Also that year, the Hamilton Tiger-Cats wore red, black, and white replicas of the 1943 Hamilton Flying Wildcats to celebrate the 70th anniversary of their 31st Grey Cup victory. In both cases, the uniforms from these games were worn only once. The Winnipeg Blue Bombers wore 1980s-themed uniforms from 2013 to 2015 before switching full-time to similar royal blue jerseys in 2016. The Roughriders introduced new throwback uniforms based on the uniforms from the early 1980s in 2014 and wore them again in 2015. The franchise introduced another green retro-styled jersey in 2016, but due to lack of numbers on the shoulders, were never actually worn before in their history.

As of the 2015 CFL season, the Saskatchewan Roughriders, Winnipeg Blue Bombers, and Toronto Argonauts have worn throwback uniforms representing four different decades, which is the most in the league. The Roughriders have worn six different throwback jerseys, including two white jerseys, which is also the most in the league. No Ottawa franchise (Ottawa Rough Riders, Ottawa Renegades, and Ottawa Redblacks) has ever worn a throwback uniform, presumably due to their checkered absences from the league over the past 20 years.

Cricket 
In February 2005 at Eden Park, Auckland, Australia and New Zealand contested the very first Twenty20 cricket international match. Both teams appeared in retro 1980s-style tight-fitting One Day International uniforms without team names, numbers or sponsors' logos. The Australians wore their original "yellow and gold" whilst New Zealand were in "beige" inspired by the Beige Brigade sports fans. The game was played in a light-hearted manner with both teams sporting 1980s-style head bands, moustaches and hairstyles.

Cycling 
When Lance Armstrong won his fifth Tour de France championship, in 2003, his U.S. Postal Service-sponsored team wore a special jersey sporting the old U.S. Mail logo from the 1970s for the final day of the race. This was not technically a throwback jersey, as the team itself did not exist in that era, and had only been affiliated with USPS since 1998.

Ice hockey 

Throwbacks were first introduced in the National Hockey League in their 75th anniversary season of 1991–92. At the time, only the Original Six teams wore throwbacks, although they were also used in the All-Star game.

While the NHL had long since replaced the heavy wool sweaters with more modern air-knit jerseys, the patterns for the 75th anniversary throwbacks were consistent with the original versions, with a few exceptions (as noted below). Player surnames were worn on the back of the throwback jerseys, even though this was not originally the case (the NHL did not require names on the jerseys until 1977).

The Original Six teams' throwbacks included the following modifications:
 Boston Bruins – c. 1927 through 1931 "shield logo" design  The Bruins' colors were brown and gold during this era, but the throwback jerseys use a "basic black" scheme with a small amount of white and gold trim, with the "shield logo" on the front of the jersey, and the "spoked-B" modern day regular logo placed on the jersey shoulders. For the Winter Classic that they hosted at Fenway Park on January 1, 2010, they wore adapted replicas of the first "Spoked B" logo from 1947 to 1948 on the 1955–58 gold jerseys.
 Chicago Blackhawks – c. 1940 design  The Blackhawks' "barber pole" design was used one more time, in a game against Detroit at Chicago Stadium in January 1994. A c.-1936 design, featuring beige in the color scheme, was used in the 2009 NHL Winter Classic on January 1, 2009, at Chicago's Wrigley Field; it would become the team's third jersey for the 2009–10 season.
 Detroit Red Wings – c. 1928 design  At the time the design was originally worn, the Red Wings were known as the Cougars. They wore their throwbacks again in the aforementioned game at Chicago Stadium in 1994. (The design was also used by Wayne Gretzky's team of All-Stars that toured Europe during the 1994–95 NHL lockout, and by the Adirondack Red Wings as a third jersey). For the Winter Classic in 2009, the Wings donned a modified version of their inaugural 1926 sweater, which featured a single red stripe across the chest with a stylized "D" in the center, along with the current winged wheel logo to the shoulders.
 Montreal Canadiens – c. 1926 design  The Canadiens' red jerseys have changed very little. The differences between the throwback and their current jersey were the crew collar and the duplicate Canadiens logo on the left sleeve. Three "retro" jersey designs from the Canadiens' past were authorized as part of the team's centennial celebration in 2009, including a "barber pole" design of red, white and blue horizontal stripes.
 New York Rangers – c. 1940 design  This jersey was notable because it was of the style the Rangers wore when they had last won the Stanley Cup. (They won the cup again two years later.)
 Toronto Maple Leafs – c. 1940 design  The two-stripe design was used for many years by the Maple Leafs, and after over two decades of the single-stripe design, the Leafs adopted a new version of the two-stripe design the following season.
 Wales Conference All-Stars – c. 1952 design (white)
 Campbell Conference All-Stars – c. 1952 design (red)  The stripes running down the sleeves of the All-Star jerseys were wider than those on the original versions.

As other leagues began using throwbacks, interest in retro jerseys increased within the NHL. To celebrate new ownership, the New York Islanders wore a modified throwback design for one game in 1998. The Buffalo Sabres pulled a similar stunt for a game in 2003. The Toronto Maple Leafs also brought back a 1960s-era jersey as a third jersey beginning in 1998–99. In 2003–04, the NHL implemented a Vintage program, allowing several teams to wear throwback uniforms that were specially branded with a vintage "V" patch. The following teams were among those that participated in the program:
 Boston Bruins – c. 1970s uniforms  These were notable as the Bobby Orr-era uniforms. The black throwbacks would replace the gold third jerseys in 2006.
 Edmonton Oilers – c. 1990s uniforms  The current Oilers only wore the white uniforms once, for the Heritage Classic. The Oilers alumni wore the blue version for the preceding MegaStars game. For 2008–09, this uniform served as the Oilers' third jersey and became the team's primary jersey in 2009–10.
 Los Angeles Kings – c. 1977 uniforms
 Montreal Canadiens – c. 1946 (white), c. 1960 (red)  The white throwbacks, similar in design to the red jersey with its blue-and-white stripe across the chest, continued to be worn as an alternate jersey in subsequent seasons. The red throwbacks featured a tie-up collar, a design feature that has seen a comeback in recent years, although it's there strictly for aesthetic purposes.
 New York Islanders – 1972–73  This uniform, from the team's first season featured similar-(though not the same) colored numbers on similar (though not the same)-colored trim against a royal blue background, serving as the 2008–09 and 2009–10 third jersey, was elevated to their full-time home uniform in 2010–11.
 New York Rangers – c. 1977 uniforms  This uniform featured the team's shield logo instead of "RANGERS" written diagonally across the chest. Ironically, these throwback jerseys were actually newer in design than their regular jerseys.
 St. Louis Blues – c. 1979 uniforms  Their then-current uniforms, introduced in 1998, were at least partially inspired by these uniforms.
 Vancouver Canucks – c. 1977 uniforms  The blue throwbacks would replace their screen-printed red/blue alternate in 2006. These throwbacks served as the basis for Vancouver's new uniforms in 2007.
 Philadelphia Flyers – c. 1974 uniforms  The first two times the Flyers wore these jerseys, the numbers were the same as the old ones. The numbers on the throwbacks worn in 2008–09 are the same as the numbers on their current road and third jerseys. These will serve as the Flyers' primary home jerseys for the 2009–10 season; a white version was used for the Winter Classic at Fenway Park January 1; these will serve as of 2010–11 as their road uniforms.

A few teams also introduced "fauxback" uniform (a term that was coined by Paul Lukas, the creator of the Uni Watch column and blog, for a uniform design not worn in the past, but given the appearance of decades-old vintage) designs as alternate jerseys. The Colorado Avalanche introduced burgundy third jerseys similar in design to the New York Rangers' blue ones, while the Minnesota Wild introduced a red alternate featuring a logo encased in a circle containing the team's name, a feature previously used by the Blackhawks and Pittsburgh Penguins. The 2004 National Hockey League All-Star Game also featured faux throwback designs. The Sabres introduced a "fauxback" jersey designed as an homage to its American Hockey League predecessor, the Bisons, in 2010 and wore it as their third jersey until 2012.

The Bruins, Canadiens, Maple Leafs, and Canucks used their throwbacks through 2006–07. The Buffalo Sabres also wore a throwback blue-and-gold jersey for one season, bringing it back again in 2008–09, and making it their 2009–10 home sweater. Although third jerseys were temporarily discontinued for 2007–08 so that teams could get used to the new Rbk Edge uniforms (third jerseys returned for the 2008–09 season), Boston and Vancouver have adopted new uniforms that are based on their throwback designs.

On January 1, 2008, the Sabres and the Penguins donned throwback uniforms in the AMP Energy NHL Winter Classic at Ralph Wilson Stadium in Orchard Park, New York, albeit with Reebok's "Edge" design template. The Penguins also used the throwbacks as their third jersey for the 2008–09 season. And as mentioned earlier, at the 2009 NHL Winter Classic, the Blackhawks and the Red Wings wore throwback replicas at Wrigley Field and the Flyers and Bruins donned retro schemes at Fenway Park in 2010. For the 2011 game, the Penguins (1967–68) and their opposition, the Washington Capitals (1974–75) are expected to wear their first season replicates.

After Reebok took over manufacturing of NHL jerseys, CCM, owned by Reebok, made additional replica throwbacks available for sale, in addition to those that were worn by teams at the time. 1992 throwbacks such as Detroit's and Chicago's were among those reissued, while others included older-era jerseys of current NHL teams the Phoenix Coyotes, the Colorado Avalanche, the Dallas Stars, the Carolina Hurricanes and the New Jersey Devils when they had played in their former markets of (Winnipeg, Quebec City, Bloomington, Minnesota, Hartford and Denver). The much-maligned "Flying-V" uniforms of the Vancouver Canucks were also reissued. The Winnipeg jerseys were particularly popular and were seen throughout Winnipeg after it became clear that a new Winnipeg Jets franchise would be established in 2011; Jets jerseys were prevalent at the 2011 NHL Draft, where the new Jets' name was revealed.

Like when Reebok took over manufacturing, Adidas had a year where no team had a full time third. When Adidas reinstated the third jersey program in the 2018–19 season, a few teams used the occasion to unveil Heritage uniforms, which were only used at least three times and on a part-time basis. Among the teams that participated include the Maple Leafs (white/green St. Patricks' design from the 1920s), Devils (1980s home design), Jets (design based on the original Jets' WHA uniforms), Oilers (blue uniforms from the Wayne Gretzky era) and Hurricanes (late 1980s Hartford Whalers green uniform). For the 2019–20 season, the Canucks wore their "skate blade" uniforms from the 1990s, while the Kings brought back their 1990s white uniforms for a few games. A few other teams, namely the Arizona Coyotes, Calgary Flames, St. Louis Blues and Washington Capitals, reinstated their throwbacks as full-fledged alternates, although the Blues did bring back their mid-1990s blue uniforms for a few games in the 2019–20 season.

For the 2021 and 2022–23 seasons Adidas introduced the "Reverse Retro" program, where each team created a specialty jersey that took elements of old jerseys with a twist. Some teams had colour swapped traditional uniforms, like the Edmonton Oilers who swapped Orange and Blue on their 1980s uniforms, and New Jersey Devils who swapped Green and Red on their '80s uniforms. Other teams merged two eras of their jerseys. The Los Angeles Kings took their original colours of forum blue and gold, and applied it to their 1990s style of jerseys which were only in black and silver. As well, there were teams who combined the looks of their current and former franchises. Such as the Minnesota Wild using North Star colours on their own logo, and the Colorado Avalanche applying their current colours to the style of the Quebec Nordiques jersey.

In recent years, some NHL teams gradually brought back classic styles as full-time uniforms. The Penguins' current uniforms, for example, were based on the early 1990s set worn by Mario Lemieux during their first two Stanley Cup championship runs. The Oilers have twice revived the Wayne Gretzky-era blue and orange uniforms from the 1980s, most recently in 2022–23. Other throwback uniforms worn by the Arizona Coyotes, Buffalo Sabres, and Calgary Flames were also brought back on a full-time basis. Still other teams, such as the Colorado Avalanche, New York Islanders, and Ottawa Senators, began wearing modified versions of throwback uniforms from an earlier era.

See also 
 Retro style
 Away colors
 Third jersey
 Mitchell & Ness
 Special paint scheme – "Retro" paint jobs found their way into NASCAR in the 1990s
 Turn Ahead the Clock

References

External links 

 ESPN Page 2 looks at Major League Baseball throwbacks worn in 2002
 NHL Uniforms.com, visual history of NHL uniforms
 NFL 75th Anniversary Throwbacks
 AFL Heritage Round

Design
Retro style
Sports terminology
Sports uniforms
Replicas
Nostalgia